Siah Mazgi (also Romanized as Sīāh Mazgī) is a village in Ahmadsargurab Rural District, Ahmadsargurab District, Shaft County, Gilan Province, Iran. At the 2006 census, its population was 1,425, in 343 families.

References 

Populated places in Shaft County